Romantist Egoist (Japanese:ロマンチスト・エゴイスト) is the debut album by the Japanese rock band Porno Graffitti, it was released on March 8, 2000.

It contains a total of 13 songs, including the debut single "Apollo" and this album's lead single "Hitori no Yoru". Most of the songs on the album were created before the band's major label debut.

Track listing

References

2000 debut albums
Porno Graffitti albums
Japanese-language albums
Sony Music albums